USS Murray (DD-97) was a  built for the United States Navy during World War I.

Description
The Wickes class was an improved and faster version of the preceding . Two different designs were prepared to the same specification that mainly differed in the turbines and boilers used. The ships built to the Bethlehem Steel design, built in the Fore River and Union Iron Works shipyards, mostly used Yarrow boilers that deteriorated badly during service and were mostly scrapped during the 1930s. They had a crew of 6 officers and 108 enlisted men.

Performance differed radically between the ships of the class, often due to poor workmanship. The Wickes class was powered by two steam turbines, each driving one propeller shaft, using steam provided by four water-tube boilers.

The ships were armed with four 4-inch (102 mm) guns in single mounts and were fitted with two  1-pounder guns for anti-aircraft defense. Their primary weapon, though, was their torpedo battery of a dozen 21 inch (533 mm) torpedo tubes in four triple mounts. In many ships a shortage of 1-pounders caused them to be replaced by 3-inch (76 mm) anti-aircraft (AA) guns. They also carried a pair of depth charge rails. A "Y-gun" depth charge thrower was added to many ships.

Construction and career
Murray, named for Commodore Alexander Murray and Commodore Murray's grandson, Alexander Murray,, was laid down 22 December 1917 by Fore River Shipbuilding Corporation, Quincy, Massachusetts; launched 8 June 1918; sponsored by Miss Alice S. Guthrie; and commissioned at Boston 21 August 1918.

During her four years of operations along the East Coast and in the Caribbean with the Atlantic Fleet, Murray aided in postwar development of antisubmarine and mine warfare techniques. She was reclassified to a light minelayer (DM-2) 17 July 1920, and received alterations necessary to her new role. She decommissioned at Philadelphia 1 July 1922, and lay there in reserve until stricken from the Navy list on 7 January 1936. She was sold for scrapping 29 September 1936 to Schiavone-Bonomo Corporation, New York City.

Notes

References

External links
NavSource DD-97

 

Wickes-class destroyers
World War I destroyers of the United States
Ships built in Quincy, Massachusetts
1918 ships
Wickes-class destroyer minelayers